Minturn is a town in Lawrence County, Arkansas, United States. The population was 109 at the 2010 census.

Geography
Minturn is located southeast of the center of Lawrence County at  (35.973425, -91.028815).

According to the United States Census Bureau, the town has a total area of 1.3 km (0.5 mi2), all land.

 Arkansas Highway 367 passes through the center of Minturn. It follows the former route of U.S. Route 67, which now passes east of Minturn on a four-lane freeway with no direct access to the town. Highway 367 leads northeast  to Hoxie and southwest the same distance to Alicia. 
 Arkansas Highway 228 leads west  to a dead end at the Black River.

Demographics

As of the census of 2000, there were 114 people, 50 households, and 33 families residing in the town. The population density was 84.6/km (217.8/mi2). There were 58 housing units at an average density of 43.1/km (110.8/mi2). The racial makeup of the town was 97.37% White, and 2.63% from two or more races.

There were 50 households, out of which 36.0% had children under the age of 18 living with them, 50.0% were married couples living together, 12.0% had a female householder with no husband present, and 34.0% were non-families. 32.0% of all households were made up of individuals, and 20.0% had someone living alone who was 65 years of age or older. The average household size was 2.28 and the average family size was 2.85.

In the town, the population was spread out, with 28.1% under the age of 18, 6.1% from 18 to 24, 29.8% from 25 to 44, 23.7% from 45 to 64, and 12.3% who were 65 years of age or older. The median age was 34 years. For every 100 females, there were 90.0 males. For every 100 females age 18 and over, there were 82.2 males.

The median income for a household in the town was $23,036, and the median income for a family was $25,313. Males had a median income of $17,188 versus $15,750 for females. The per capita income for the town was $11,438. There were 35.9% of families and 32.0% of the population living below the poverty line, including 41.9% of under eighteens and 15.8% of those over 64.

References

External links
 Encyclopedia of Arkansas History & Culture entry

Towns in Lawrence County, Arkansas
Towns in Arkansas